Leticia Díaz de León Torres (born 22 October 1969) is a Mexican politician from the National Action Party. From 2006 to 2009 she served as Deputy of the LX Legislature of the Mexican Congress representing San Luis Potosí, and previously served in the Congress of San Luis Potosí from 1997 to 2000.

References

1969 births
Living people
People from San Luis Potosí
Women members of the Chamber of Deputies (Mexico)
National Action Party (Mexico) politicians
20th-century Mexican politicians
20th-century Mexican women politicians
21st-century Mexican politicians
21st-century Mexican women politicians
Deputies of the LX Legislature of Mexico
Members of the Chamber of Deputies (Mexico) for San Luis Potosí
Universidad Autónoma de San Luis Potosí alumni
Members of the Congress of San Luis Potosí